Frankie Boyle's New World Order is a British comedy television programme created, written and presented by Frankie Boyle. Premiering in 2017 on BBC Two, it followed his BBC iPlayer-exclusive "Autopsy" shows. After a few minutes of stand-up, he makes two statements and discusses them with his guests. Boyle summarises each debate in a short monologue to camera. The programme finishes with Boyle sitting against the desk delivering a final longer monologue to camera. Throughout its six series, regular guests include Sara Pascoe, Katherine Ryan, Mona Chalabi, Miles Jupp, Sophie Duker and Kiri Pritchard-McLean. The show also has annual specials that review news of the year.

Production
Following on from his BBC iPlayer-exclusive "Autopsy" shows, New World Order airs as prime time TV on BBC Two. It follows a very similar structure to Boyle's "Autopsy"; instead of the studio audience voting in agreement or disagreement with the thesis, however, Boyle summarises the debate in a short monologue to camera. The show premiered on 8 June 2017.

The show returned for a review of the year on 29 December 2017 as Frankie Boyle's 2017 New World Order. The second series of seven episodes started on 18 May 2018. The data journalist Mona Chalabi became a regular in this series. Another end-of-year review show, Frankie Boyle's 2018 New World Order, was broadcast on 27 December 2018. A third series began on 29 March 2019. Ryan was not in this series, having left the show. An end-of-year review show, Frankie Boyle's 2019 New World Order, was broadcast on 30 December 2019. A fourth series that debuted on 3 September 2020 was followed by a 2020 review show on 1 January 2021. In September 2021, Boyle announced that the show would return for a fifth series the following month, recorded in Glasgow.

Boyle spoke about the writing and filming process for series six in July 2022. He said that he would workshop material for the series in the Glee Club, Glasgow from July to the recording—this includes the closing monologues, co-authored by Charlie Skelton. He planned around 40 "warm-up shows" to practice jokes. Boyle said: "there's often a bit at the start where there's three big jokes that lead you in", to "try and get [the audience] on board and create some confidence with them".

Episode list

Series 1 (2017)
As with the Autopsy shows, Sara Pascoe and Katherine Ryan were regulars for the first series.

Special (2017)

Series 2 (2018)
The series returned with Boyle, Pascoe and Ryan joined by the data journalist Mona Chalabi for the first half of the series. For the second half, Miles Jupp took over as a regular in place of Ryan. Chalabi was absent from the second half of the series.

Special (2018)

Series 3 (2019)

Special (2019)

Series 4 (2020)
This series was filmed without a studio audience, with a revised socially-distanced set due to COVID-19.

Special (2020/2021)

Series 5 (2021)
Filmed in front of a live studio audience in Glasgow.

Special (2021)

Series 6 (2022)
Filmed in front of a live studio audience in Glasgow.

Special (2022)

Most appearances
Up to and including 27 December 2022 (excludes the 5 "Unseen & Best Bits" episodes).

24 appearances
 Miles Jupp

22 appearances
 Sara Pascoe

15 appearances
 Sophie Duker
 Kiri Pritchard-McLean

11 appearances
 Jamali Maddix

8 appearances
 Katherine Ryan

6 appearances
 Desiree Burch
 Mona Chalabi
 Rob Delaney
 Susie McCabe

4 appearances
 Ahir Shah

3 appearances
 Sara Barron
 Rosie Jones
 Richard Osman
 Lucy Prebble
 Romesh Ranganathan

Reception
The show was nominated for the best Entertainment Performance BAFTA in 2020.

Footnotes

References

External links
 
 
 

2017 British television series debuts
2010s British satirical television series
2010s British television talk shows
2020s British satirical television series
2020s British television talk shows
BBC satirical television shows
BBC television talk shows
English-language television shows
Improvisational television series
Television series by Zeppotron
Television series by Banijay